Source Code Capital is a Beijing-based venture capital firm founded in 2014. The firm invests in companies from various fields such as information technology, biotechnology, retail and manufacturing.

Background 

Source Code Capital was founded in 2014 by Yi Cao, a computer science graduate from Tsinghua University and a vice president at Sequoia Capital China.

Investors of the firm include pension funds, sovereign wealth funds, college endowments, charities and private equity firms.

The firm runs a peer and mentor alliance called "Code Class" each year, which consists of over 300 entrepreneurs and investors. Within the community, members can exchange experiences, resources and feedback to one another. Notable members of Code Class include Zhang Yiming of Bytedance and Wang Xing of Meituan.

The firm is noted to have invested in some of China's startups such as Bytedance, Meituan, Li Auto and Niu Technologies.

Funds

Notable investments 

 Bytedance
 Guazi.com
 Meituan
 Li Auto
 Niu Technologies

References

External links
 

Chinese companies established in 2014
Financial services companies established in 2014
Investment management companies of China
Venture capital firms of China